Claudinei dos Santos Oliveira (born 29 September 1969), known as Claudinei Oliveira, is a Brazilian professional football coach and former player who played as a goalkeeper. He is the current head coach of Vila Nova.

Playing career
Born in Santos, São Paulo, Claudinei started his professional career with Santos in 1989, but failed to make an appearance for the club. He subsequently represented Jaboticabal, Nacional de Uberaba, Mamoré,  (two stints), Caldense, Olímpia, Portuguesa Santista, São Bento, Remo, Tuna Luso, Nacional-SP and Ferroviária, retiring with the latter in 2003.

Managerial career
Oliveira began his managerial career as a coach at his first club Santos, joining the under-15 squad in 2009 and leading them to a Campeonato Paulista under-15 title. The following year, he was promoted to under-17s and won the Campeonato Paulista of the category. In 2011, Oliveira was assigned to the under-20s. He went on to win both Campeonato Paulista in 2012 and Copa São Paulo de Futebol Júnior in 2013; the latter came after a 29-year absence.

On 31 May 2013, after Muricy Ramalho's dismissal, Oliveira was appointed manager of the first team in Série A. His first game in charge occurred the following day, a 1–1 home draw against Grêmio, and his first victory came on 12 June, in a 1–0 home defeat of Atlético Mineiro.

Oliveira remained in charge of the main squad until the end of the season, leading the side to a seventh place overall. After being relieved from his duties and being replaced by Oswaldo de Oliveira, he signed with Goiás.

On 14 April 2014, after losing the Campeonato Goiano to Atlético Goianiense, Oliveira was sacked. Two days later, he was appointed manager of Paraná.

On 3 September 2014, Oliveira was appointed at the helm of Atlético Paranaense. Dismissed the following 15 March, he was named Vitória manager two days later, but was sacked on 20 May.

On 25 November 2015, Oliveira returned to Paraná for the ensuing season. He was relieved from his duties on 13 June of the following year, and was named Avaí manager on 25 August.

Oliveira managed to achieve a top-tier promotion in his first season, but suffered immediate relegation in his second. On 19 April 2018, he was sacked.

On 25 April 2018, Oliveira replaced sacked Nelsinho Baptista at the helm of Sport Recife. On 12 August, after a 3–1 home loss against São Paulo, he left the club, and returned to Paraná for a third spell three days later.

On 16 October 2018, Oliveira resigned from Paraná and moved to fellow first division strugglers Chapecoense. Despite avoiding relegation at the end of the season, he was sacked the following 17 March, and returned to Goiás on 23 April; on 4 August, after a 6–1 loss to former side Santos, he was dismissed.

On 17 February 2020, Oliveira was appointed manager of Botafogo-SP, replacing sacked Wagner Lopes. He helped the club avoid relegation in the 2020 Campeonato Paulista, but resigned on 20 November after only five wins in 22 matches.

On 9 December 2020, Oliveira returned to Avaí in the place of Geninho. He again led the club to another promotion to the first division in 2021, but was sacked on 6 February 2022, after a poor start of the new campaign.

Oliveira was named in charge of Operário Ferroviário on 20 March 2022, but was sacked exactly four months later. On 24 July, he returned to Sport after nearly four years, and left on a mutual agreement on 16 November, after failing to achieve promotion.

On 1 December 2022, Oliveira was appointed manager of Vila Nova also in the second division.

Managerial statistics

References

External links
 

1969 births
Living people
Brazilian footballers
Association football goalkeepers
Santos FC players
Associação Atlética Caldense players
Associação Atlética Portuguesa (Santos) players
Esporte Clube São Bento players
Clube do Remo players
Tuna Luso Brasileira players
Nacional Atlético Clube (SP) players
Associação Ferroviária de Esportes players
Brazilian football managers
Campeonato Brasileiro Série A managers
Campeonato Brasileiro Série B managers
Santos FC managers
Goiás Esporte Clube managers
Paraná Clube managers
Club Athletico Paranaense managers
Esporte Clube Vitória managers
Avaí FC managers
Sport Club do Recife managers
Associação Chapecoense de Futebol managers
Botafogo Futebol Clube (SP) managers
Operário Ferroviário Esporte Clube managers
Vila Nova Futebol Clube managers
Santos FC non-playing staff
Sportspeople from Santos, São Paulo